D2iQ is an American technology company based in San Francisco, California which develops software that simplifies Kubernetes lifecycle management, deployment to hybrid, multi-cloud, and edge environments and enables advanced application use cases. Its flagship product is called the D2iQ Kubernetes Platform (DKP).

History
The company, initially named Mesosphere, was established in 2013 by Benjamin Hindman, Tobias Knaup and Florian Leibert. In June 2014 the company announced $10.5 million of venture capital investment from Andreessen Horowitz, Data Collective and Fuel Capital.
A second round of $36 million investment was announced in December 2014, led by Khosla Ventures.

In August 2015, it was reported that Microsoft was in talks to acquire Mesophere. Valuations ranged from $150 million up to $1 billion, but nothing was officially disclosed.

Another investment round of $73.5 million in March 2016 was led by Hewlett Packard Enterprise, and included Microsoft.

The company was mentioned by marketing firm Gartner in 2016. 
It was listed by TechCrunch in 2016 for companies having valuation ranging in between $500 million to $1 billion.
It had a 2016 contract with the United States government, and reportedly an investment from In-Q-Tel, controlled by the US Central Intelligence Agency.

On April 19, 2016, Mesosphere open-sourced Datacenter Operating System. At the launch, Autodesk announced that they were able to reduce running AWS instances by 66% using DC/OS.

On May 7, 2018, the company announced a $125 million Series D round of investment.

As of August 5, 2019, Mesosphere Inc. was renamed D2iQ.

On September 20, 2021, D2iQ launched the D2iQ Kubernetes Platform (DKP) V2 and Kaptain AI/ML.

Mesosphere DC/OS

Mesosphere DC/OS (short for Datacenter Operating System), is an open-source, distributed operating system built with Apache Mesos.  It was developed by Mesosphere (before the company renamed) and announced in April 2016.  The difference between DC/OS and other cluster managers is the ability to provide dedicated container scheduling.  The latest release, DC/OS  2.2.1, was on November 5, 2020. DC/OS was replaced with the D2iQ Kubernetes Platform in 2020.

Origins
The term datacenter operating system was promoted in the paper The Datacenter Needs an Operating System, published at the University of California, Berkeley. In the paper Zaharia et al. describe four areas of functionality that a datacenter OS should provide:

 Resource sharing
 Data sharing
 Programming abstractions
 Debugging and monitoring

The paper promoted the Mesos project for resource sharing among frameworks on a shared compute cluster.

Architecture
Datacenter Operating System categorizes components as being in user space or kernel space. Kernel space includes the Mesos master and agents while user space includes various system components of Datacenter Operating System. These components include (among others): 
 Admin Router, an internal load balancer
 Cosmos, an internal packaging API service
 Exhibitor, a Java supervisor system for ZooKeeper
 Marathon, an Apache Mesos framework for container orchestration
 Mesos-DNS, an internal DNS service

D2iQ Kubernetes Platform (DKP) 

The D2iQ Kubernetes Platform (DKP) provides a single, central point of control for managing single and multi-cluster environments and running applications across any infrastructure, including on-prem, cloud, air-gapped, and edge.

DKP is a complete solution that includes the technology, expert services, training, and support offerings to ease Kubernetes adoption, expand Kubernetes use across distributed, heterogeneous environments, and enable advanced application use cases, such as ML and fast data pipelines, to ensure successful Day 2 operations. 

DKP replaced DC/OS in 2020. 

Also available as an add-on product is Kaptain AI/ML, which is a comprehensive machine learning and artificial intelligence (AI/ML) platform that simplifies AI/ML operations, enabling data scientists to focus on attaining actionable business insights rather than configuring complex AI infrastructures.

References

Technology companies based in the San Francisco Bay Area
2013 establishments in California